Tain-l'Hermitage (or ), commonly known as Tain, is a commune in the French department of Drôme, southeastern France.

Geography
It is located on the left bank of the river Rhône, opposite Tournon-sur-Rhône, which is located in Ardèche. The view from the vine-covered hill above the town has attracted many tourists including, in 1788, future American President Thomas Jefferson.

Economy
A notable wine producing commune, wines include Hermitage AOC and Crozes-Hermitage AOC, Cornas AOC. The red wines are produced from Syrah, and the whites from Marsanne and/or Roussanne. Tain-l'Hermitage is home to a large number of wineries, including Maison M. Chapoutier, Caves de Tain and Paul Jaboulet Âiné, as well as many smaller domaines.

In 1818 the commune was the home of French wine négociant Calvet, founded by Jean-Marie Calvet. Shortly after, it expanded to Bordeaux, establishing itself in the city proper and building a château in the Médoc in 1870.

International relations
The commune is twinned with:
 Fellbach, Germany
  Erba, Italy

Population

See also
Communes of the Drôme department

References

Communes of Drôme